Nivea B. Hamilton (also known as Nivea H. Nash) (born March 24, 1982), better known by her mononym Nivea, is an American R&B singer whose recordings reached the Billboard charts during the early 2000s.  Nivea is known most for her Grammy-nominated hit "Don't Mess with My Man" as well as "Laundromat" and "Okay" featuring YoungbloodZ & Lil' Jon. She has released three studio albums: Nivea (2001), Complicated (2005), Animalistic (2006), and an independently released extended play Nivea: Undercover (2011). On September 26, 2019, she released her album Mirrors, including the single "Circles".

In 2022, the song Virginia was commercialised as single and received excellent reviews.

Early life
Nivea was born in Savannah, Georgia, the youngest of three sisters. She sang in a church choir and admired the music of Mariah Carey. Nivea admitted to being shy in a BET "Finding Nivea" interview. She said, "I never wanted anyone to hear me sing... my parents would turn down the radio [and I would automatically stop]."

Career

2000–2003: Nivea

In 2000, Nivea appeared on Mystikal's hit single "Danger (Been So Long)" which garnered her some buzz. Following the success of it, she had signed with Jive Records and released her debut solo single "Don't Mess with the Radio " in 2001 which garnered moderate success, peaking at No. 90 on the Hot 100 and No. 85 on R&B. Her label then decided to focus on her internationally, releasing her self-titled debut album in Australia and Japan first. On September 25, 2001, the album was released in United States peaking at No. 80 on the Billboard 200 and No. 85 on R&B. "Run Away (I Wanna Be with You)" (featuring Pusha T) was released as the album's next single in Japan in December 2001.

In August 2002, she released her second U.S. single, "Don't Mess with My Man" featuring Brian and Brandon Casey (of R&B group Jagged Edge). The single was a big hit, peaking at No. 8 on the Hot 100 at No. 25 on R&B, fueling album sales of her debut. The following year, "Don't Mess with My Man" was nominated for a Grammy Award for Best R&B Performance by a Duo or Group with Vocals.

The album's third U.S. single "Laundromat" featured singer R. Kelly and starred comedian Nick Cannon playing her love interest in the music video. The single became another hit for the singer, peaking at No. 20 on R&B and No. 58 on the Hot 100.

2004–2008: Complicated and Animalistic

Following the success of her first album, she began work on her second studio album, releasing a buzz single "You Wanna Touch Me" featuring rapper Rasheeda and Akon which peaked at No. 86 on R&B. After meeting Terius "The-Dream" Nash, they began dating and he soon handled the primary production on her forthcoming album.

In 2005, she released the project's lead single "Okay" which featured YoungbloodZ and Lil' Jon. The single became a hit, peaking at No. 14 on R&B and No. 40 on Billboard's Hot 100. In May, she released her second album Complicated which peaked at No. 9 on the R&B chart and No. 37 on the Billboard 200. A second single, "Parking Lot" was released shortly before she got pregnant with her first child. Jive Records subsequently dropped promotion for the project, although she appeared on Soul Train the following year and performed "Complicated" which was originally planned to be the third single. After her departure from the label, she gave birth to her twins in April. That same year, she begun work on her next studio album and signed a new contract with Formula Records.

Primarily produced by her then-husband, The-Dream, her third album Animalistic was released on November 15, 2006, exclusively in Japan, led by the single "Watch It" which garnered some airplay. Plans for a U.S. release in 2007 were eventually shelved. However, she premiered new material on her Myspace profile such as "I Might" "Look Back" and "Zodiac" although they were never released officially. She later took a hiatus from the music industry to focus on raising her children following her divorce.

2009–2014: Undercover and "Loud Blunt"
In 2010, she released a buzz single titled "Love Hurts" which featured rapper Lil' Wayne as her love interest in the music video. Also that year, she appeared on a few mixtapes including Sir Will ("It Only Hurts Forever") and Rasheeda ("Surprise" "Say Something Remix").

She later announced that she would release an acoustic EP titled Nivea: Undercover and premiered the set's first single, a cover of the Sade song "Love Is Stronger Than Pride" in early 2011. In September 2011, the EP was released independently. She also collaborated with George Reefah on the single "Bump", which received a music video.

In 2012, she announced work on her fourth studio album, tentatively titled "Purple Heart" which was set for a May release. The following year, she renamed the album to Nivea Revealed and announced a new single "Loud Blunt" which was released in November 2013 on digital services.

2015–present: Mirrors, The Randy Watson Collection, collaborations and Virginia
In October 2015, Nivea revealed that she will be releasing two albums simultaneously through her own record label. One of the projects will be titled The Randy Watson Collection, which would be an acoustic LP, with her father behind the production. According to the singer, Randy Watson will explore a love story between herself and two men, and is influenced by neo soul and pop. The second project will be titled Mirrors and will be an R&B album with urban undertones.

In early 2018, she announced she was working with Wash House Entertainment. She collaborated with Snypa on the song "This Way", which was released in January. In April, she announced and premiered her new single "Circles" in Atlanta. In September, she was featured on the song "Dope New Gospel" on Lil Wayne's album Tha Carter V. On September 29, 2018, she released the single "Circles".

On September 16, 2019, she was featured on the song "Oh Oh" from the rapper SugaCane. On September 26, 2019, she released her album Mirrors, including the single "Circles". In mid October she confirmed that she will be joining fellow R&B legend and singer Paula DeAnda for their long awaited collaboration, both Singers have confirmed this on separate interviews in 2020 that they have stayed in contact and plan to have the single set for 2021.

In 2021, Nivea appeared on the reality show BET Presents: The Encore alongside former girl group members Shamari Devoe (of Blaque), 702 sisters Irish & LeMisha Grinstead, Cherish twins Fallon & Felisha King, Pamela Long (of Total), Aubrey O'Day (of Danity Kane), and Kiely Williams (of 3LW & The Cheetah Girls).

On January 7, 2022, Nivea released a new single, "Virginia", her first new release in 2 years. Ken Hamm of Soulbounce.com reviewed "Virginia" stating, "Nivea’s plight shows us that maybe love just isn’t enough. Over sultry keys and guitar licks, Nivea sings about a man who makes her feel warm when the world feels so cold. However, this love thang is a situationship, not a relationship; she’s wifey, but not the wife" while amethystmusicnewsmagazine.com wrote "R&B veteran/singer/songwriter Nivea is back with a new single entitled, 'Virginia.' On the track, the singer displays the beautiful vocals that she’s known for singing."

In mid October she confirmed that she will be joining fellow R&B singer Paula DeAnda for their long awaited collaboration, both Singers have confirmed this on separate interviews in 2020 that they have stayed in contact and plan to have the single set for 2022.

Personal life
In February 2002, Nivea started dating rapper Lil Wayne. On December 11, 2002, they became engaged. In her July 2003 interview with Sister to Sister magazine, Nivea spoke about her engagement and how Wayne proposed.  "Wayne said, 'I got your Christmas present with me and you're gonna love it. It's gonna make you smile. He got down on his knee and he was like, 'I know I'm young, but I've been through enough relationships to know and understand the meaning of what love is.' He was just perfect. He told me that he wanted to spend the rest of his life with me and he loved me. It was snot and tears at the same time." She also spoke on her wishes to have a son with the rapper. "I want a little boy very much right now. Wayne's daughter is just wonderful. She's a beautiful little girl."  Nivea credited Wayne as being her first love. She said that if they didn't get married, that she would die a single woman. In August 2003, Lil Wayne called off his engagement to Nivea.

Nivea married R&B singer and producer Terius "The-Dream" Nash in December 2004. Their daughter Navy Talia Nash was born on May 10, 2005, and their twin sons London Nash and Christian Nash in April 2006. The couple divorced in 2007. Nash stated in an interview, "I decided to end it because I didn't want to take this person [Nivea] and treat them a certain way based on what I was changing into, based on being bitter."  However, Nivea says The-Dream wanted the divorce, not she. "I'm lying, it's not. We're supposed to say that, but it's not true. It wasn't no mutual agreement, he wanted to do it, I didn't, but it's done. I'm dealing with it."

After her divorce in 2007, Nivea reconciled with her ex-fiancé, rapper Lil Wayne. Nivea stayed with Lil Wayne after he had a son with his ex-girlfriend Sarah Vivan in 2008. On June 9, 2009, it was rumored that Nivea and Lil Wayne were engaged and expecting a child together. At the same time Lil Wayne was also expecting a child with actress Lauren London. On October 14, 2009, Lil Wayne confirmed that he and Nivea were expecting a son.  Nivea gave birth to their son, Neal Carter on November 30, 2009.  In June 2010, Nivea and Lil Wayne broke off their engagement for the second time.

Discography

 Nivea (2001)
 Complicated (2005)
 Animalistic (2006)
 Mirrors (2019)

Filmography
 The Parkers (Season 4, episode 22) (2003)

References

External links

1982 births
20th-century American women singers
21st-century American women singers
African-American crunk musicians
20th-century African-American women singers
American contemporary R&B singers
American hip hop singers
Jive Records artists
Living people
Musicians from Savannah, Georgia
Zomba Group of Companies artists
20th-century American singers
21st-century American singers
21st-century African-American women singers